Henry Fleming MBE (1871 or 1872–1956) was a unionist politician in Northern Ireland.

Fleming worked as a shipyard plater at Harland and Wolff, and served as the Irish auditor of the United Society of Boilermakers.  He joined the Ulster Unionist Party and, despite having no previous political experience, was elected to the Senate of Northern Ireland in 1945, serving until his death in 1956.

Fleming was awarded the MBE.

References

1870s births
1956 deaths
Members of the Order of the British Empire
Members of the Senate of Northern Ireland 1945–1949
Members of the Senate of Northern Ireland 1949–1953
Members of the Senate of Northern Ireland 1953–1957
Ulster Unionist Party members of the Senate of Northern Ireland
Trade unionists from Belfast
Politicians from Belfast